Yara is a small town and municipality in the Granma Province of Cuba, located halfway between the cities of Bayamo and Manzanillo, in the Gulf of Guacanayabo. Yara means "place" in the Taíno language.

History
The Taíno Cacique (chief) Hatuey was burnt at the stake in Yara, on February 2, 1512, after he organized a guerrilla war against the Spaniards. Hatuey is known as "Cuba's First National Hero". This action gave birth to one of Cuban mayor's myths; "La Luz de Yara", The Light of Yara.

On October 10, 1868, the beginning of the Ten Years' War in Cuba occurred and is known as El Grito de Yara (The Cry of Yara) and was the beginning of the First Cuban War of Independence.

Yara was established as a municipality in 1912, when Manzanillo was split up.

Geography
The municipality is divided into the barrios of Yara, Yara Arriba, Veguitas, Buey de Gallego, Coco, Caboa, Cabagán, Calambrosio, Canabacoa, Cayo Redondo, José Martí, Los Cayos, Mateo Romás and Sofía.

Demographics
In 2004, the municipality of Yara had a population of 59,415.

Personalities
Bartolomé Masó (1830–1907), soldier and politician
Tete Puebla (born 1940), Cuban politician
Harry Villegas (1940–2019), Cuban revolutionary
Huber Matos (1918–2014), Cuban revolutionary military leader, political dissident against Castro's marxist regime, political prisoner, activist and writer

See also
Circuito Sur de Oriente
Municipalities of Cuba
List of cities in Cuba

References

External links

Populated places in Granma Province